Stratford School may refer to:

Stratford School, a secondary school in Forest Gate, London, England
Stratford Elementary School, in Stratford, California, United States
Stratford School District, in Stratford, New Jersey, United States
Stratford School District (Wisconsin), in the List of school districts in Wisconsin
Stratford School (California), a chain of private schools in the United States

See also
Stratford High School (disambiguation)